The La Brea owl (Oraristix brea) is an extinct owl reported from the Upper Pleistocene asphalt deposits of the La Brea Tar Pits in Los Angeles, California. It was first described in 1933 by Hildegarde Howard as Strix brea, but this extinct owl was recently placed into its own genus by Campbell and Bocheński (2010). The La Brea owl has also been found in the Upper Pleistocene asphalt deposits of Carpinteria, California. Oraristrix brea is interpreted as more terrestrial in habits than forest owls because, compared to North American species of Bubo and Strix, it had longer legs relative to its wingspan.

See also
Glaucidium kurochkini, a pygmy owl also known from the La Brea Tar Pits
Asphaltoglaux, another owl from the La Brea Tar Pits, this one being more closely related to owls of the genus Aegolius

References

Strigidae
Pleistocene birds of North America
Fossil taxa described in 2010

Late Quaternary prehistoric birds
Extinct monotypic bird genera